West Pole or The West Pole may refer to:

The West Pole, a 2009 album by The Gathering
The West Pole, in Bee Cave, Texas
The West Pole, a 1994 book by American author Diane Glancy

See also
 East Pole–West Pole divide, division in the fields of cognitive psychology and cognitive neuroscience
 West Polesian
 West Polesie